Orroroo may refer to:

Orroroo, South Australia, a town and locality
Orroroo Enterprise, a former newspaper in South Australia
District Council of Orroroo, a former local government area in South Australia

See also
District Council of Orroroo Carrieton